Paul Kearney (born 1967) is a Northern Irish fantasy author. He is noted for his work in the epic fantasy subgenre and his work has been compared to that of David Gemmell.

Life
Kearney was born in Ballymena, Northern Ireland, in 1967. He studied Anglo-Saxon, Middle English, and Old Norse at Oxford University before spending several years in both the United States and Denmark before returning to Northern Ireland. He currently lives and writes in County Down.

Writings
Kearney made his name with the stand-alone novels The Way to Babylon (1992), A Different Kingdom (1993) and Riding the Unicorn (1994). All these novels had some common threads, most notably the use of a hero from our world who journeys into a fantastical one. Despite strong reviews, these books had commercially disappointing sales, and Kearney was asked to consider a more traditional fantasy epic. The outcome was the Monarchies of God, which brought him a measure of success, and ran to five volumes.

After finishing the Monarchies series, Kearney embarked on a new series, The Sea Beggars, which began with The Mark of Ran (2004) and tells the story of Rol Cortishane. It is based almost entirely around ocean-based adventures. A second volume, This Forsaken Earth, was published in July 2006. The series was expected to be four books long and the third had nearly been completed when the series was unexpectedly dropped by Bantam in May 2007. However, Kearney was quickly signed-up by publisher Solaris Books, who contracted him to write a new fantasy epic entitled The Ten Thousand and based loosely on the Anabasis of Xenophon. This book was published in August 2008. Solaris also re-issued the Monarchies of God series as a two-volume omnibus edition and intends to publish the finished Sea Beggars series as soon as Bantam give up the publishing rights. Kearney has also written a tie-in novel based on the Primeval TV series.

In 2009, after a hiatus brought about by Solaris' purchase by Rebellion Books, Kearney was contracted for two additional books set in the world of The Ten Thousand and the Monarchies omnibuses was scheduled for late 2010 publication.

In 2009 Kearney was longlisted for the inaugural David Gemmell Legend Award for Best Fantasy Novel.

Bibliography
Short Stories
 "South Mountain" (2014, in Dangerous Games)

Novels
 The Way to Babylon (1992)
 A Different Kingdom (1993)
 Riding the Unicorn (1994)
 Primeval: The Lost Island (2008)
 The Wolf in the Attic (2016)
 The Other Side of Things (2019)

The Monarchies of God
 Hawkwood's Voyage (1995)
 The Heretic Kings (1996)
 The Iron Wars (1999)
 The Second Empire (2000)
 Ships from the West (2002)
 Hawkwood and the Kings (2010, the first volume of an omnibus edition, collecting Books 1-2)
 Century of the Soldier (2010, the second volume of an omnibus edition, collecting Books 3-5)

The Sea Beggars
 The Mark of Ran (2004)
 This Forsaken Earth (2006)
 Storm of the Dead (unpublished)
The series was dropped by the original publisher after the second book was published. In 2011 the series was picked up by Solaris, who were due to publish the completed series as an omnibus in 2012 but this was delayed indefinitely due to legal issues with the American publisher. However, due to the US publishers never releasing the rights for the final book, Solaris were unable to publish any of them.

The Macht
 The Ten Thousand (2008)
 Corvus (2010)
 Kings of Morning (2012)

Warhammer: 
 "Broken Blood", short story in Death & Dishonour (2010)

Warhammer 40.000: 
 "The Last Detail", short story in Legends of the Space Marines (2010)
 "The Blind King", short story (2015)
 Umbra Summus, novel, was to be released in May 2015 but currently on hold due to legal issues.
 Calgar's Siege (2017), novel
 Calgar's Fury (2017), novel
 Calgar's Reckoning (2018), novel

Other:
The Dumps (2010), The Burning Horse (2019).

References

External links
 
 Interview with Paul Kearney at SFFWorld.com

Living people
People from County Antrim
Male novelists from Northern Ireland
1967 births